The Tsurumi Line is a group of 3 railway lines operated by East Japan Railway Company (JR East) in Kanagawa Prefecture, Japan. Originally built to service the port and adjacent industrial area, the lines provide passenger services (especially for local workers) along a line between Tsurumi Station in Tsurumi-ku, Yokohama and Ōgimachi Station in Kawasaki-ku, Kawasaki, and 2 short branches with a total length of track to 9.7 km.

Japan Freight Railway Company (JR Freight) operates on three segments of the line, often to carry petroleum and other chemicals from the numerous refineries and factories in the area. The line is also used to carry jet fuel from the US Navy fuel depot near Anzen Station through the Musashino Line to Yokota Air Base in west Tokyo.

Station list 
 All stations are located in Kanagawa Prefecture.

Main Line

Umi-Shibaura Branch

Ōkawa Branch

Rolling stock

 205-1100 series 3-car EMUs (since August 2004)

Three-car 205-1100 series EMU trainsets modified from former 205-0 series trainsets were introduced on the Tsurumi Line from 25 August 2004. Nine 205-1100 series 3-car trains operate on the line.

Former
 KuMoHa 12 (Ōkawa Branch Line service, from December 1972 until March 1996)
 72 series (from 1972 until January 1980)
 101 series (from 1980 until March 1992)
 103 series (from 2 August 1990 until 17 March 2006)

Freight
Locomotives seen hauling freight trains include the EF65 and DE10.

Other
A shuttle bus for Toshiba employees at runs in a loop between Asano, Shin-Shibaura, and Umi-Shibaura stations on a schedule alternating with Tsurumi Line trains. Both the bus and the stops are marked with the Toshiba logo.

History
The  opened the Bentembashi to Hama-Kawasaki line, including the branch to Okawa in 1926, and extended the mainline to Ogimachi in 1928. In 1930, the Tsurumi to Bentembashi section opened, the lines were electrified at 600 V DC, and passenger services commenced on both lines. The Asano to Shin-Shibaura section opened as a freight-only line in 1932, and was extended to Umi-Shibaura in 1940, with passenger services commencing upon the opening of the extension.

On 20 August 2016, station numbering was introduced with Tsurumi line stations being assigned station numbers between JI01 and JI10. Station numbers were also introduced to the Umi-Shibaura branch (station numbers JI51 and JI52) as well as the Ōkawa branch (station number JI61).

The company was nationalised in 1943, and in 1948 the voltage was increased to 1,500 V DC.

References

External links

 Stations of the Tsurumi Line (JR East) 

 
Lines of East Japan Railway Company
Railway lines in Kanagawa Prefecture
1067 mm gauge railways in Japan
Railway lines opened in 1926
1926 establishments in Japan